Delta Phi Epsilon  or Delta Phi Epsilon Foreign Service Council the largest national American professional foreign service fraternity and sorority. Founded on January 25, 1920, it was the first fraternity dedicated to careers in foreign diplomacy in trade. Its Alpha chapter went on in the first half of the twentieth century to colonize new chapters at many other universities throughout the country, although most chapters went defunct in the latter half of the century. In 1973 Delta Phi Epsilon Foreign Service Sorority was founded, with its Alpha chapter at Georgetown University. As of 2021, there remained ten active collegiate chapters, half of which were created between 2016 and 2018.

History

Fraternity 
The fraternity was founded in the wake of World War I, in a time of increased interest in world politics and solving global issues with diplomacy. In 1919, Fr. Edmund A. Walsh, S.J. at Georgetown University founded the School of Foreign Service (SFS) and in 1924, the Rogers Act formed the basis of the United States Foreign Service. During this time, other groups with similar missions, such as the Council on Foreign Relations, were founded, along with international bodies such as the League of Nations.

The four founders of the fraternity were Alfred O. Arseneau, Wesley O. Ash, Samuel C. Bartlett, and T. J. Patrick O'Connell. At first, three of them, all undergraduates in Georgetown's SFS living together on 10th Street, held in common only their experience in overseas military service and their interest in foreign service careers. Soon they met the fourth, Pat O'Connell, who thought of founding a foreign service fraternity independently. They were drawn together by their common vision for a professional foreign service fraternity for future graduates of the School of Foreign Service and others in the field.

Later these men joined with seven other interested undergraduates (future brothers Sandager, Butts, Ash, MacKenzie, Brooks, Sullivan, Scott, and Bates) and signed the Articles of Agreement. After choosing a name and nominating officers, Delta Phi Epsilon Foreign Service Fraternity was formally founded at the Catholic Community House at 6th and E Streets, NW, on January 25, 1920. The group was incorporated in the District of Columbia on April 20, 1920. Early expansion focused on both East and West Coast schools. The fraternity's activities and expansion ceased during World War II. After the war, the fraternity saw even greater expansion into institutions across the United States. and by the 1960s, the fraternity began to see a decline in the number of its chapters. During the 1970s most of the fraternity's collegiate chapters went inactive, leaving only the original Alpha. This decline is attributed to two major factors: a national decline in professional fraternities and a negative perception generally of foreign service. During the Vietnam War, foreign service was closely associated in many minds with current United States foreign policy, which was protested against at many member institutions.

After some attempts during the 1990s, several of these defunct chapters were revived in the 2000s. The Alpha chapter at Georgetown University went defunct, but was revived in 1990 after ten years of inactivity and revived again in 1998 after another five years of inactivity. In the summer of 2003, the first reactivation of a dormant chapter, Epsilon chapter at UC Berkeley, occurred. In 2016, the first co-ed chapter, Delta chapter, was founded at USC by Jacob Lokshin and eleven other USC students. This was soon followed by the creation of Pi chapter, Psi chapter, Chi chapter, Eta chapter, Gamma chapter, and Mu chapter.

Alpha chapter was the longest-lived collegiate chapter of Delta Phi Epsilon; its undergraduate officers all resigned in 2018 and suspended all chapter activities in protest to actions of national leadership. The chapter three successive one-person initiations over the succeeding eighteen months. In late February 2020, Alpha initiated the chapter's 200th line of ten initiates, just before the fraternity's 100th Founders' Day Banquet.

Sorority 
In the 1950s, some members suggested that the fraternity accept women. Gregory Creutz (Alpha 1921), national general secretary led the way to a compromise. In 1956 the National Board of Directors of the fraternity created the Delta Phi Epsilon International Society of Business and Foreign Affairs which was to be open to both men and women. However, that society failed to develop,

Another movement to make the fraternity coed emerged in the late 1960s. During the 1972 National Convention, members voted to amend the bylaws to admit female members. However, the amendment ultimately failed because the members did not approve it a second time at either of the next two conventions.

In June 1972, the Alpha chapter at Georgetown changed to include both a fraternity and a sorority of the Delta Phi Epsilon Professional Foreign Service. The two groups operated separately when it came to recruiting and initiating members. However, the two groups worked together for professional and social programs.

The Alpha chapter of the sorority held its first initiation on February 24, 1973. A second chapter of the sorority, Epsilon chapter, was founded at UC Berkeley in 2003.

In January 2021, the American University chapter withdrew from the national organization, saying that the national board "was unrepresentative of its values." The group continued as the local organization Sisterhood for International Engagement.

Co-ed 
In 2016, the fraternity's National Convention endorsed a proposal for joint fraternity-sorority projects, including publishing a peer-reviewed Delta Phi Epsilon Journal of Foreign Affairs, operating a scholarship competition for students who had been initiated into Delta Phi Epsilon, and holding an annual symposium promoting alumni and student international relations research. This project developed into the Delta Phi Epsilon Foreign Affairs Council, incorporated and recognized as a 501(c)(3) nonprofit educational organization in 2016. The council originally selected its leaders from Delta Phi Epsilon members to support international relations education, promote public engagement in foreign policy, and provide career development tools to Delta Phi Epsilon brothers and sisters.

In 2016, the first co-ed chapter, Delta chapter, was founded at USC by Jacob Lokshin and eleven other USC students. The Gamma chapter also merged the sorority and fraternity into a single co-ed chapter in 2016. However, some of the national fraternity's leadership continue to oppose the admission of women.

Scandals 
In July 2018, The Chronicle of Higher Education published several accounts of student and alumni fraternity members, accusing Terrence Boyle of sexism and bigotry. Boyle has served as the fraternity's general secretary for nearly 40 years, controlled the alumni newsletter, and oversaw pledge recruitment for the Alpha chapter. Charges included making the sorority members clean the bedrooms and wash the socks of the fraternity members. In addition, no females had held national leadership positions. In the article and in a petition shortly following it, leaders from most fraternity chapters, along with many non-DPE Fraternity members, called for Boyle's resignation. In August 2018, the Alpha chapter officers resigned and closed the chapter's activities after Georgetown University's student newspaper, The Hoya, published an opinion piece authored by presidents of Eta, Chi, and Pi chapters calling for Georgetown students to boycott Alpha chapter. Boyle appointed new student leadership for the Alpha chapter from outside of Georgetown; however, several of the fraternity's other chapters indicated that they would not recognize this new leadership.

In 2021, the District of Columbia Attorney General, Karl Racine, filed a case against the foundation and the Delta Phi Epsilon corporation. The complaint alleged that funds belonging to the foundation were used by Boyle, to buy a house at In 1990 on 34th Street NW. In addition, Boyle sold the fraternity's chapter house for $2.6 million when it was appraised for $4 million. Racine's complaint indicated that Boyle oversaw the transfer of the chapter house from the fraternity to the foundation where he withheld information about the value of the property. In addition, Boyle essentially stopped the foundation's obligatory issuance of scholarships 37 years. In April 2022, the Office of the Attorney General filed a motion for summary judgment in the case.

Chapter house 
The fraternity purchased the former Seymour House in Georgetown as a chapter house for $27,500 in 1940. Constructed in 1869 by merchant William E. Seymour, 3401 Prospect Street Northwest was home to the Alpha Chapter until 2020. The three-story brick chapter house had fifteen rooms. It is a contributing property to the Georgetown Historic District and became a National Historic Landmark listed on the National Register of Historic Places in 1967. For decades, the Alpha Chapter of Delta Phi Epsilon was the only fraternal organization at Georgetown University with its own house. It was used for keg parties and social events.

During the February 2020 annual meeting of Delta Phi Epsilon, its members voted to sell 3401 Prospect Street for as much money as possible. Alpha Chapter's historic house purportedly had to be sold because it was believed that Georgetown University implemented a rule requiring undergraduates to live on campus for four years. A new house might be purchased by the foundation, not the fraternity or the Delta Phi Epsilon corporation. It would be based on a clubhouse model and would be owned by the foundation. It would not be a boarding house and would not be owned by the Delta Phi Epsilon corporation, which had owned 3401 Prospect Street.

Organizational structure 
Several distinct and separate corporations use the name Delta Phi Epsilon.

Delta Phi Epsilon, Incorporated is a professional foreign service fraternity that is a 501(c)(7) nonprofit corporation. This corporation is a member-based nonprofit corporation. This organization is rare, and perhaps unique, among American fraternal organizations in that its membership as a whole does not elect the members of its board of directors. The board is self-appointed. Sitting board members select replacements to fill board seats as seats become vacant.

The Delta Phi Epsilon Foundation for Foreign Service Education is a 501(c)(3) nonprofit organization established in 1960. Its purpose is to give scholarships to students. In September 2021, The Washington Post reported that the foundation stopped issuing scholarships in 1984, including withholding $52,000 in bequests that were designated for scholarships.

Chapters 
Active chapters are listed in bold. Inactive chapters are listed in italic.

Notes

Notable members 
The fraternity initiates Line Brothers, those who pledge when they are students, and National Brothers, mostly those already out of school who only go through the required final initiation ritualistic ceremonies.

References

External links
Alpha chapter sorority
Gamma chapter
Delta chapter
Epsilon chapter
Eta chapter fraternity
Eta chapter sorority
Mu chapter sorority
Chi chapter

Student organizations established in 1920
Professional fraternities and sororities in the United States
Georgetown University student organizations
New York University
George Washington University
University of the Pacific (United States)
University of California, Berkeley
American University
1920 establishments in Washington, D.C.